Dmitri Nikolayevich Astakhov (born 9 March 1986) is a former Russian professional football player.

Club career
He played two seasons in the Russian Football National League for FC Spartak Nizhny Novgorod and FC Volga Ulyanovsk.

External links
 
 

1986 births
People from Inzhavinsky District
Sportspeople from Tambov Oblast
Living people
Russian footballers
Association football midfielders
FC Spartak Tambov players
PFC CSKA Moscow players
FC Lokomotiv Moscow players
FC Baltika Kaliningrad players
FC Mordovia Saransk players
FC Volga Ulyanovsk players
FC Spartak Nizhny Novgorod players